is a mecha and character designer born in the Kagawa Prefecture of Japan on December 18, 1965.

In 1996, Sato met with Kazuyoshi Katayama to begin work on The Big O. Until then, Sato's work consisted mainly of designing characters and supervising animation for anime series. The Big O is the first based on a concept of his creation and he considers it his magnum opus. Sato's style is influenced by his "love of all things nostalgic."

Filmography

Director
Karas (2005)
Tiger & Bunny (2011)
Asura (2012)
Black Butler (2014)
Saint Seiya: Legend of Sanctuary (2014)
Rage of Bahamut: Genesis (2014)
Gantz: O (2016, chief director)
Rage of Bahamut: Virgin Soul (2017)
Inuyashiki (2017, chief director)
Go! Go! Loser Ranger! (TBA)

Other
Mobile Suit Gundam: Char's Counterattack (Key Animation)
Genesis Survivor Gaiarth (Animation Director (ep. 3))
Giant Robo (Animation supervisor)
Mobile Suit Victory Gundam (Animation Director)
Fatal Fury: The Motion Picture (Key Animation)
Junkers Come Here (Original Character Design)
The Brave of Gold Goldran (Animation Director (eps. 12, 16, 21))
Brave Command Dagwon (Opening Animation (op1))
Ninja Resurrection (Character Design, Chief Animation Director)
Urotsukidoji (Character Design)
City Hunter: Goodbye my Sweetheart (Character design, Chief animation supervisor)
Sentimental Graffiti (Visual director)
City Hunter: Death of the Vicious Criminal Ryo Saeba (Character design)
The Big O (Original concept, Character design, Mecha designer)
The SoulTaker (Storyboard (ep. 5), Creature design, OP director)
Mazinkaiser (Mecha design)
Wolf's Rain (Animation director)
Mazinkaiser: Shitou! Ankoku Daishogun (Mecha design)
Mobile Suit Gundam Unicorn (Animation Director (ep. 1))
C (Conceptual Design)
Unofficial Sentai Akibaranger (Character design)

References

External links

Anime directors
People from Kagawa Prefecture
1965 births
Living people
Mechanical designers (mecha)